Falko Droßmann (born 11 December 1973) is a German politician who has been serving as Member of the Bundestag for Hamburg-Mitte since the 2021 elections.

Early life and career 
Droßmann grew up as the son of a bus driver and a cleaning woman. At the age of 17, he became a police officer.

Droßmann became a member of the Bundestag in the 2021 elections. He has since been serving on the Defence Committee and the Subcommittee on Disarmament, Arms Control and Non-Proliferation.

Other activities 
 Magnus Hirschfeld Foundation, Alternate Member of the Board of Trustees (since 2022)

Personal life 
Droßmann has been married to Denny Krienke since 2017.

References 

1973 births
Living people
Members of the Bundestag 2021–2025
Members of the Bundestag for the Social Democratic Party of Germany
Members of the Bundestag for Hamburg
Politicians from Hamburg
LGBT members of the Bundestag
Gay politicians
German police officers